Julia Warhola (born Juliana Justina Zavaczki; November 20, 1891, village of Mikó, Austria-Hungary (now Miková, Slovakia – November 22, 1972, Pittsburgh, Pennsylvania, U.S.), was the mother of the American artist Andy Warhol.

Life 
Julia Warhola was born Juliana Justina Zavaczki to a peasant family in the Rusyn village of Mikó, Austria-Hungary (now Miková in northeast Slovakia) and married  (Americanized as Andrew Warhola) there in 1909. He emigrated to the United States soon after, and in 1921 she followed him to Pittsburgh, Pennsylvania. The couple had three children: Paul (1922–2014), John (1925–2010), and Andy (1928–1987) . The family lived at several Pittsburgh addresses, but beginning in 1932 at 3252 Dawson Street in the Oakland neighborhood of the city. The family was Byzantine Catholic and attended St. John Chrysostom Byzantine Catholic Church. Her husband who was born in 1889, died in 1942.

Julia enjoyed singing traditional Rusyn folk songs and was artistic. She loved to draw, and her favorite subjects were angels and cats. She also did embroidery and other crafts, such as bouquets of flowers made from tin cans and crepe paper. During the Easter season she decorated eggs in the Pysanka tradition.

As a widow, she moved to New York City in 1951 to take care of Andy. He often used her decorative handwriting to accompany his illustrations. She won awards for her lettering, including one from the American Institute of Graphic Arts for an album cover for The Story of Moondog, featuring the musician Louis Thomas Hardin in 1958. In 1957 she illustrated a small book called Holy Cats and she also worked on 25 Cats Name Sam and One Blue Pussy.

In 1966, Andy made a movie called Mrs. Warhol (color, 66 minutes). It features Julia in her basement apartment in Andy's house playing "an aging peroxide movie star with a lot of husbands," including the most current spouse, played by Richard Rheem. Andy follows her with his camera as she goes about her daily domestic routines.

In 1971, she returned to Pittsburgh and died a year later. She is buried, alongside her husband and near her son Andy, in St. John the Baptist Byzantine Catholic Cemetery in Bethel Park, Pennsylvania, a south suburb of Pittsburgh.

References

External links 
 The Warhola Family website

1890s births
1972 deaths
People from Stropkov District
American Eastern Catholics
American people of Lemko descent
American people of Slovak descent
Artists from Pittsburgh
Austro-Hungarian emigrants to the United States
Place of death missing
Ruthenian Greek Catholics
Warhola family